Hemerocallis minor, is also known as dwarf daylily, grassleaf lily and small daylily. It is native to northern Asia (Siberia, Mongolia, China, Korea). The plant grows up through 0.5 m high. Its wide yellow flowers are scentless. It is a hermaphroditic species, pollinated by insects such as honey bees.

In China, the flowers are eaten as a traditional food.

Propagation 
Propagation is by seed, which Hemerocallis minor produces in capsules, and by dividing clumps.

References 

Garden plants
minor
Flora of temperate Asia
Plants described in 1768
Inflorescence vegetables
Taxa named by Philip Miller